The University of Massachusetts Press is a university press that is part of the University of Massachusetts Amherst.  The press was founded in 1963, publishing scholarly books and non-fiction.  The press imprint is overseen by an interdisciplinary faculty committee. The press is currently a member of the Association of University Presses.

Juniper Prizes
The press also publishes fiction and poetry through its annual Juniper Prizes. The Juniper Prize was named in honor of local poet Robert Francis and his house ('Fort Juniper'). The Juniper Prizes include:

 2 prizes for poetry: one for a previously published poet, one for a poet not previously published
 2 prizes for fiction: one for a novel, one for a collection of short stories
 creative non-fiction
The poetry award began in 1975, the fiction award in 2004, and the award for creative non-fiction in 2018.

See also

 List of English-language book publishing companies
 List of university presses

Notes

References

External links
University of Massachusetts Press official website

Press
Massachusetts, University of
Publishing companies established in 1963
Book publishing companies based in Massachusetts
American companies established in 1963